Cristo y Rey is a biopic series created by Daniel Écija starring Jaime Lorente and Belén Cuesta respectively as circus tamer Ángel Cristo and actress Bárbara Rey. It is produced by Good Mood for Atresmedia.

Plot 
The plot follows the toxic relationship between circus tamer Ángel Cristo and actress and  icon Bárbara Rey, which was very popular during the Transition and was mired behind the scenes by instances of drug use, infidelity, ludomania and domestic violence, while also covering the alleged affair of Rey with "a powerful stateman".

Cast

Production and release 
Jaime Lorente was disclosed to have been cast as Ángel Cristo in December 2021 while Belén Cuesta was disclosed to have been cast as Bárbara Rey in February 2022. On 11 May 2022, Atresmedia reported the beginning of shooting and disclosed a number of additional cast members (including the actors set to portray Juan Carlos and Sofia). The series will air both on Antena 3 and Atresplayer Premium. The writing team, coordinated by Andrés Martín Soto and Patricia Trueba, also featured, Daniel Écija, César Mendizábal, Iñaki San Román, and Ángel Gasco-Coloma. A 15 January 2023 premiere on Atresplayer Premium was scheduled.

References 

2020s Spanish drama television series
Spanish biographical television series
2023 Spanish television series debuts
Atresplayer Premium original programming
Spanish-language television shows
Television shows set in Spain